MotherFatherSon is a British thriller television series starring Richard Gere his first major television role Helen McCrory, Billy Howle, Ciarán Hinds and Elena Anaya. The series broadcast on BBC Two began on 6 March 2019 and ended on 24 April 2019. It averaged 2.69 million viewers.

Synopsis
A fractured family at the heart of politics and power is pulled together under catastrophic circumstances.

Cast and characters
 Richard Gere as Max Finch, American newspaper owner and Kathryn's ex-husband
 Helen McCrory as Kathryn Villiers, British heiress and Max's ex-wife
 Billy Howle as Caden Finch, 30-year-old son of Max and Kathryn
 Pippa Bennett-Warner as Lauren Elgood, senior adviser to Max
 Sinéad Cusack as Maggie Barns, journalist and ex-political correspondent for the National Reporter
 Diana Kent as Charlotte, Kathryn's mother
 Joseph Mawle as Scott Ruskin, who attends the homeless shelter where Kathryn visits and develops a close relationship with her
 Paul Ready as Nick Caplan, journalist for the National Reporter
 Danny Sapani as Jahan Zakari, first Muslim Prime Minister of the United Kingdom
 Sarah Lancashire as Angela Howard, Leader of the Opposition
 Ciarán Hinds as Walter Finch, Max's father
 Peter Sullivan as Tate, Max's head of security
 Steven Cree as Andrew Bentham
 Angélica Aragón as Verónica
 Elena Anaya as Sofia, Max's current wife
 Niamh Algar as Orla, Caden's girlfriend
 Richard Stoker as Charlotte's husband

Episodes

Production
BBC Studios produced the series, which was Richard Gere's first TV role since appearing in Kojak in 1976. Promoting the upcoming project, Gere said, "It’s been almost 30 years since I worked in television. I'm so pleased to be working now with the BBC on this extraordinary eight-hour project with such talented people and which resonates so much to the time we live in". He seemed less enamoured of the project after filming, telling the UK's  Radio Times magazine, "It was six months’ shooting, like doing four indie movies back to back but playing the same character. It’s too long. I don’t think I’ll do it again." Directed by James Kent, filming took place in summer 2018 in London and on location in Spain.

Release
The series premiere was on BBC Two in March and April 2019. It will be distributed internationally by BBC Studios.

References

External links
 
 

2010s British drama television series
2010s British television miniseries
2019 British television series debuts
2019 British television series endings
BBC high definition shows
BBC television dramas
English-language television shows
Fictional trios
Television series by BBC Studios